In mathematical analysis, Tannery's theorem gives sufficient conditions for the interchanging of the limit and infinite summation operations. It is named after Jules Tannery.

Statement 

Let  and suppose that .

Proofs 
Tannery's theorem follows directly from Lebesgue's dominated convergence theorem applied to the sequence space .

An elementary proof can also be given.

Example 
Tannery's theorem can be used to prove that the binomial limit and the infinite series characterizations of the exponential  are equivalent. Note that

 

Define . We have that  and that , so Tannery's theorem can be applied and

References

External links 

Generalizations of Tannery's Theorem
Mathematical analysis
Limits (mathematics)